Gerrard Eugene Cole (February 18, 1928 – January 11, 2018) was an American athlete who competed mainly in the 400 metres.

Born in New Lexington, Ohio, Gene Cole attended Lancaster High School (Ohio). He competed for the United States in the 1952 Summer Olympics held in Helsinki, Finland in the 4 x 400 metre relay where he won the silver medal with his teammates 400 metres bronze medalist Ollie Matson, Charles Moore and Mal Whitfield.

References

1928 births
2018 deaths
American male sprinters
Olympic silver medalists for the United States in track and field
Athletes (track and field) at the 1952 Summer Olympics
Medalists at the 1952 Summer Olympics
People from New Lexington, Ohio